The First Battle of Tembien was a battle fought on the northern front of what was known as the Second Italo-Ethiopian War.  This battle consisted of attacks and counterattacks by Italian forces under Marshal Pietro Badoglio and Ethiopian forces under Ras Kassa Haile Darge.  This battle was primarily fought around Worsege Pass (Italian: Passo Uarieu) in what was then the Tembien Province of Ethiopia.

Background
On 3 October 1935, General Emilio De Bono advanced into Ethiopia from Eritrea without a declaration of war.  De Bono had a force of approximately 100,000 Italian soldiers and 25,000 Eritrean soldiers to advance towards Addis Ababa.  In December, after a brief period of inactivity and minor setbacks for the Italians, De Bono was replaced by Badoglio.

Haile Selassie launched the Christmas Offensive late in the year to test Badoglio.  Initially successful, the goals of this offensive were overly ambitious.

As the progress of the "Christmas Offensive" slowed, Italian plans to renew the advance on the "northern front" got under way. In addition to being granted permission to use poison gas, Badoglio received additional ground forces. The elements of the Italian III Corps and the Italian IV Corps arrived in Eritrea during early 1936. By mid-January, Badoglio was ready to renew the advance on the Ethiopian capital. Badoglio overwhelmed the armies of ill-armed and uncoordinated Ethiopian warriors with mustard gas, tanks, and heavy artillery.

Preparation
In early January 1936, the Ethiopian forces were in the hills everywhere overlooking the Italian positions and attacking them regularly. Italian dictator Benito Mussolini was impatient for an Italian offensive to get under way and for the Ethiopians to be swept from the field. In response to his frequent exhortations, Badoglio cabled Mussolini:  "It has always been my rule to be meticulous in preparation so that I may be swift in action."

The Ethiopians facing the Italians were in three groupings.  In the center, near Abiy Addi and along the Beles River in the Tembien, were Ras Kassa with approximately 40,000 men and Ras Seyum Mangasha with about 30,000 men. On the Ethiopian right was Ras Mulugeta Yeggazu and his army of approximately 80,000 men in positions atop Amba Aradam. Ras Imru Haile Selassie with approximately 40,000 men was on the Ethiopian left in the area around Seleh Leha in the Shire Province.

Badoglio had five army corps at his disposal.  On his right, he had the Italian IV Corps and the Italian II Corps facing Ras Imru in the Shire.  In the Italian center was the Eritrean Corps facing Ras Kassa and Ras Seyoum in the Tembien.  Facing Ras Mulugeta atop Amba Aradam was the Italian I Corps and the Italian III Corps.

Initially, Badoglio saw the destruction of Ras Mulugeta's army as his first priority.  Mulugeta's force would have to be dislodged from its strong positions on Amba Aradam in order for the Italians to continue the advance towards Addis Ababa.  But Ras Kassa and Ras Seyoum were exerting such pressure from the Tembien that Badoglio decided that he would have to deal with them first.  If the Ethiopian center was successful, the I Corps and III Corps facing Ras Mulugeta would be cut off from reinforcement and resupply.

On 19 January, the day before the offensive in the Tembien began, Badoglio ordered General Ettore Bastico, commander of the III Corps, to leave Makale and occupy Nebri and Negada. By doing this, Badoglio effectively closed the road to the Tembian to Ras Mulugeta, preventing him from sending reinforcements to Ras Kassa and Ras Seyoum.

Battle
On 20 January, Badoglio launched the First Battle of the Tembien. On the left of the Eritrean Corps, the 2nd Eritrean Division advanced in two columns through the area around Ab'aro Pass. On the right of the Eritrean Corps, the 2nd CC.NN. Division "28 Ottobre" advanced towards the torrent that was the Beles River. The Italian III Corps held Nebri and Negada.  

Italian general Diamanti then led a column of roughly 1500 soldiers to the Daran area, where the Ethiopians managed to push the heavily outnumbered Italians back. By the end of the day, the 2nd Eritrean Division fell back to positions around Ab'aro Pass and the 2nd CC.NN. Division on the Italian right was driven back to the Worsege Pass where it and the garrison were surrounded and besieged. For three days the Ethiopians, who had a substantial numerical superiority, launched wave after wave of attacks against the Italians cut off at Worsege Pass.  

Badoglio moved up the 1st Eritrean Division to join the 2nd Eritrean Division at Ab'aro Pass. Badoglio then ordered the commander of the 2nd Eritrean Division, General Achille Vaccarisi, to advance on the Worsege Pass and relieve the besieged Italians there.

By the afternoon of 22 January, the CC.NN. division and the garrison at Worsege Pass were still cut off and low on water and ammunition, the fury of the Ethiopian attacks was reaching a crescendo, and Badoglio drew up plans for a withdrawal to new defensive lines. There is no way to know what the result would have been if he had attempted to withdraw 70,000 men, 14,000 animals, and 300 guns of the Italian I Corps and III Corps down the single road from Makale with the forces of Ras Mulugeta at their rear. 

However the Italian troops at the Worsege pass stubbornly repulsed every Ethiopian attack and on the third day, they were relieved by Vaccarisi troops.  According to the Italians, the Ethiopians retreated when the relief force appeared.  According to the Ras Kassa, the Italian Royal Air Force (Regia Aeronautica Italiana) saved the day for Badoglio.  His men could no longer stand up to the deadly clouds of mustard gas rained down non-stop on the roads his troops took, the base camps where they gathered, and any area surrounding them.

Aftermath
By the morning of 24 January, the First Battle of Tembien came to an end. While the armies of Ras Kassa and Ras Seyoum had retreated from the area around Worsege Pass, they were not destroyed and they still held the Tembien. In addition, the armies of Ras Imru and Ras Mulugeta were fully intact. However, the threat the armies of the Ethiopian center posed to the I Corps and III Corps was neutralised and now Badoglio was free to turn his attention to the Ethiopian right and Ras Mulugeta. Badoglio considered the battle a success, the Ethiopian offensive had been prevented, their armies had lost considerable difficult to replace ammunition and had suffered many casualties. After the battle the military initiative was always in the hands of the Italians. The Battle of Amba Aradam followed next.

Roughly one month later, the Second Battle of Tembien would prove to be a more decisive encounter between Ras Kassa and Ras Seyoum armies and the Italian army.

See also 
 Ethiopian Order of Battle Second Italo-Abyssinian War
 Army of the Ethiopian Empire
List of Second Italo-Ethiopian War weapons of Ethiopia
 Italian Order of Battle Second Italo-Abyssinian War
 Royal Italian Army
List of Italian military equipment in the Second Italo-Ethiopian War

Notes 
Footnotes

Citations

References 
 
 
 

Tembien
Tembien 1
Tembien 1
Tembien 1
Tembien 1
January 1936 events
Dogu'a Tembien
de:Tembienschlacht#Erste Tembienschlacht